Štěpán Kopřiva (born March 13, 1971 in Prague) is a Czech comics person, science fiction writer, and screenwriter. He co-wrote Choking Hazard.

References

External links

Czech science fiction writers
Czech comics artists
Czech screenwriters
Male screenwriters
Living people
1971 births
Writers from Prague